Carlos Silva (25 January 1902 – ??) was a Portuguese footballer who played as a goalkeeper.

External links 
 
 

1902 births
Portuguese footballers
Association football goalkeepers
Portugal international footballers
Year of death missing